Tres de Febrero is a partido of the Greater Buenos Aires conurbation area in the Buenos Aires Province, Argentina.

Toponymy 
Tres de Febrero took its name from the 1852 Battle of Caseros between General Justo José Urquiza and Juan Manuel de Rosas, which was won by General Urquiza and marked a historical event for the country and which took place on this land.

History 

The lands that are now the Tres de Febrero partido, were inhabited, before the discovery of the Americas and during the first years of the conquest, by Querandí Indians and pampas.
These aborigines preferred set their huts near watercourses, in this case, along the current Reconquista River and stream: Morón, Maldonado and Medrano.
Engaged in culture corn, squash and bean.
Upon the arrival of the Spaniards, the Indians fought tenaciously to defend their possessions but were defeated and had to submit to the conqueror.
The distribution of lands that began with the second foundation of Buenos Aires by Juan de Garay in 1580, marked the beginning of the process of settlement and urbanization of the area (now called Metropolitan Area of Buenos Aires).
The urbanization of Tres de Febrero partido, although has specific characteristics, participates in its broader aspects of the mode of development of the vast majority of Greater Buenos Aires parties.
Possessions granted for Juan de Garay consisted in "solars", lots where houses were made, farms and estates that were surrounding villages and used for growing vegetables were established, cereal and tambera production.
Until the early years of this century the area served the function of supplier of agricultural products to Buenos Aires City.
In the early 18th century this area, formerly Pago de las Conchas, renamed the Curato de San Isidro, formed by existing parties San Martín,
San Isidro, Tres de Febrero and Vicente López.
Circulation was performed through the old highways linking the area with La Matanza Partido, Morón Partido, Luján and the Buenos Aires city.
The installation of the railroad, from 1876, helped identify the first urban settlement.

Around the same time appears rural tram of Lacroze brothers, electrical from 1908, which starting from Medrano and Corrientes street, came to the village of San Martín, constitute, together with the low cost of the properties in the area, a factor of strong stimulus for demographic settlement.

Until the end of 1800, the only railroad station in the partido was the Caseros station, around were created administrative offices, homes and shops were located zonal importance. From the early years of 1900 were created new railroad stations which determined the development of other mainly residential areas (like Santos Lugares (1906), Ciudadela (1910) and Sáenz Peña (1910)).
 
Installs in June 1920 the Argentina Cruz Roja Filial Santos Lugares in the Langeri Severino 3670 street, providing relief and assistance to the immediate community of the town of Santos Lugares and from there covering all the partido. This institution made famous as the best doctors like Cerazo, Carbone, Canepa and others as important.
Until the '30s, the development of settlements was essentially ruled by the expansion of the railroad service and the transport of passengers, "the bus (El Colectivo)" (from 1930 in the Buenos Aires city) and the penetration of these services to the areas of Greater Buenos Aires, begins development of industrial settlements and housing remote areas of railroad stations or between them.
Urbanization of the partido ends in 1970 and 1972 with the fragmentation and subdivision of vacant areas to the northwest, like Loma Hermosa, El Libertador, Churruca, Remedios de Escalada and 11 de Septiembre.
When considering the stages of settlement worth noting the influence of the military settlements: Campo de Mayo and Ciudadela from 1901 and the Colegio Militar de la Nación opening in 1937, which now comprise 12% of the area of the partido.

In 1958, deputy Alfredo Longo, (born in Caseros), presented a project for the creation of a new partido called "Caseros", composed of the localities of Santos Lugares, Ciudadela, Sáenz Peña, El Palomar and Caseros, which was completed the following year with the enactment of Law 6.065 of Buenos Aires Province by which the October 15 partido was created Tres de Febrero, separating of the San Martín partido, in the area bounded by General Paz avenue, Ferrocarril General Urquiza, Triunvirato street to the Reconquista River, the Reconquista River to Díaz Vélez avenue and thence to the General Paz avenue.

The municipality of Tres de Febrero began its economic financial year and servicing in general from 1 January 1960 based on the previous quartermaster located at 2161 Lisandro Medina, Caseros.
Its first mayor was Mr. Ramón Landin who was ousted in 1962 by soldiers of the time.
The name Tres de Febrero is because on this date in 1852 was performed the Battle of Caseros between the forces of Juan Manuel de Rosas and the General Urquiza, in the lands that belong to this partido.

When in October 1959 was created the partido, one of the biggest obstacles they faced their authorities was a lack of building facilities capable of accommodating the different agencies were integrated was created, which were shortly after dispersed in fourteen different sites. This brought great inconvenience, and in 1967, the authorities decided to move forward on an old dream: The Municipal Edifice.
Was negotiated with Ferrocarriles Argentinos to use the land adjacent to the tracks, among the streets General Hornos and Juan Bautista Alberdi.
In 1968 when were resolved the issue of the place occupied, a concourse was held to the presentation of projects, He was elected work of architects Odilia Suárez and Eduardo Sarrailh. According to the rules, the set should embody a coherent urban image and with this premise was created the general structure of the set, which among other works, envisaged a walkway under the tracks, a shopping mall, banks, church and cultural center. 
Work started in 1969, being in charge of the company Sucesión Carlos Rinadi, which soon after went bankrupt, fact that produced long delays in the initial schedule.
14 years passed, during which the works were interrupted several times by different causes.
In 1983 under the quartermaster Rodolfo Vasquez's office removals occurred Mayor, time the edifice was called by the name of "Heroes de Malvinas" as a tribute to those who gave their lives in the Falklands War; and is in 1987, when the Concejo Deliberante went to take his place, leaving the former headquarters of the street Lisandro Medina, now demolished, and had been primary site of the first mayors.
Architecturally the edifice is composed of a set of volumetric forms of exposed concrete, checking various parameters carpentry aluminum. It is noteworthy that the original project underwent many changes, although with the passing of time some of the original estimates it will specifying, as in the case of the street parallel to the roads that join General Hornos with Libertador San Martín Avenue.

In February 1988 Tunnel of Libertador San Martín avenue in central Caseros opens.
The low-level step had its ribbon cutting shared between two mayors: Héctor Dáttoli and Jorge Mangas.
When installing the tunnel initially hurt businesses Valentin Gómez street. Since this was the most coveted street of partido, and installed a water source to attract the public, but was soon removed because stalking was inevitable.

Governance 
The partido of Tres de Febrero is governed by mayor Diego Valenzuela. He defeated the historic Peronist mayor Hugo Omar Curto in 2015 who had governed Tres de Febrero since 1991. Though seen as an underdog, Valenzuela squeezed a victory in his re-election bid in 2019

Mayors 
List of mayors who ruled Tres de Febrero and their respective periods:
Commissioner Martín Jorge Lasarte (01/01/1960-04/30/1960)
Mayor Ramón Landin (05/01/1960-04/30/1962)
Commissioner Arnaldo A. Barbieri (04/30/1962-11/30/1962)
Commissioner Manuel R. Fernández (11/30/1962-05/16/1963)
Commissioner Coronel Gabriel Larralde (05/16/1963-10/11/1963)
Mayor Roberto Antonio D'Elia (10/12/1963-06/30/1966)
Commissioner Coronel Ermeife Graselli (06/30/1966-07/15/1966)
Mayor Coronel Gabriel Larralde (07/15/1966-02/20/1969)
Mayor Interino Coronel Héctor Kummer (02/21/1969-04/10/1969)
Mayor Rómulo E. Repetto (04/10/1969-03/18/1971)
Mayor Interine Horacio W. Chaves (03/18/1971-05/06/1971)
Mayor Antonio Diconsolo (05/06/1971-09/17/1971)
Mayor Enrique León Dí Almonte (09/17/1971-11/02/1971)
Mayor Arturo Bombelli (01/21/1971-05/25/1973)
Mayor Roberto Manuel Heredia (05/25/1973-08/10/1975)r
Mayor Rubén Darío Novoa (08/10/1975-03/24/1976)
Mayor Interine Coronel Dardo Gilva (03/24/1976-04/30/1976)
Mayor Coronel Raúl Schweiser (04/30/1976-05/15/1981)
Mayor Rodolfo Vázquez (05/15/1981-12/10/1983)
Mayor Héctor Roberto Dátoli (12/10/1983-12/10/1987)
Mayor Jorge N. Mangas (12/10/1987-12/10/1991)
Mayor Hugo Omar Curto (12/10/1991-12/10/1995)
Mayor Hugo Omar Curto (12/10/1995-12/10/1999)
Mayor Hugo Omar Curto (12/10/1999-12/10/2003)
Mayor Hugo Omar Curto (12/10/2003-12/10/2007)
Mayor Hugo Omar Curto (12/10/2007-12/10/2011)
Mayor Hugo Omar Curto (12/10/2011-12/10/2015)
Mayor Diego Valenzuela (12/10/2015–12/10/2019)
Mayor Diego Valenzuela (12/10/2019–present)

Elections 2011 

In the elections of 2011 Hugo Curto won his sixth term with 45,18% of the vote (86.573 votes); in second place was the Broad Progressive Front (Frente Amplio Progresista) with 24.846 votes (12,97%), in third place was the Union for Social Development (Unión para el desarrollo social) with 22.684 votes (11,84%).

Elections 2013 

The October 2013 elections were held to define: deputies, senators and councilors. Striking thing was the defeat of Frente para la Victoria. In Tres de Febrero Partido in the list in which were chosen 12 councilors  and 4 school counselors, won the Frente Renovador with 46,46% of the vote (96.177 votes). Submitting councilors (6): Martín Jofre, Diego Achilli, Susana Berisso, Raul Mazzeo, Julio Candia and Dora Aguilera.
The Frente para la Victoria obtained 28,38% of the vote (58.742 votes). Submitting as councilors (4): Marta Curto, Osvaldo Santoro, Máximo Rodríguez and La Tigresa Acuña.

Third was the Frente Progresista Cívico y Social with 11,82% of the vote (24.468 votes), entering two councilors. The fourth place went to the Frente de izquierda y de los trabajadores (Left Front and Workers) with 16.846 votes (8,14%) and fifth Unidos por la Libertad y el Trabajo (United for Freedom and Labour) with 10.786 votes (5,21%).

These elections put on alert as Hugo Curto could be defeated in his next election in 2015.

Settlements 
The partido of Tres de Febrero is divided into 15 settlements, the capital being: Caseros

 Caseros
 Churruca
 Ciudad Jardín Lomas del Palomar

 Ciudadela
 El Libertador
 José Ingenieros
 Loma Hermosa
 Martín Coronado
 Once de Septiembre
 Pablo Podestá
 Remedios de Escalada
 Sáenz Peña
 Santos Lugares
 Villa Bosch
 Villa Raffo

Climate 
The climate is temperate pampas. Presents temperate hot summers and cool winters, sufficient rainfall and in some cases generating strong floods, and prevailing winds from the east and northeast.

Snowfall 
The days 6, 7 and 8 July 2007, saw the entry of a polar cold air mass, and as a result on Monday 9 July, the simultaneous presence of very cold air in both middle levels of the atmosphere and at the surface, leading to the occurrence of precipitation in the form of sleet and snow. It was the third time that a snowfall occurred in the partido. It also snowed in 1912 and 1918.

Population 
The population of Tres de Febrero according to the census of October 2010 was 340.071 inhabitants. It is the 15th most populous partido in the Buenos Aires Province.
The total fertility rate of partido is 1,65 children per woman.

According to estimates of INDEC, the population aged 65 or more would correspond to 14,15% of total and 60 years or more, 19,12% glimpsing an aging population structure.
In turn, the population aged 0–14 years, representing 20,41% of the total.

Population distribution:

Tres de Febrero in the year 2001 had 336.467 inhabitants, amounting in the year 2010 to 340.071 inhabitants; i.e. its population grew by 1,07%. Its density increased from 7.314,5/km2 to 7.392,85/km2.

The 7,98% of its population are foreigners, mainly from:

  = 30,91%
  = 23,99%
  = 10,75%
  = 8,43%
  = 7,87%
  = 6,57%
  = 3,68%
  = 1,09%
  = 0,58%
There are also migrants from other provinces of the country.

The index of masculinity is 90,8%.

Poverty affects 8,62% of the population of the partido, mainly young people between 18 and 24 years and young people from provinces.

Tres de Febrero has 112.588 homes, which indicates that living 3,02 persons for household.
In total 81,56% of the partido has sewage, 97,04% has the pipes. 88,62% has natural gas while 10,79% use carafes. The 73,14% live in houses while 24,83% live in apartments and 62,53% have a computer.

Variation Intercensal

Education 

Currently Tres de Febrero has most of 90 schools (public and private); a School Site Council (in the head town of the partido: Caseros) located on Andrés Ferreyra street, and the University of Tres de Febrero (UNTreF) was created in 1995, and attended by over 12.000 students, as it has different varieties of university courses and this located at a strategic point in the partido.

Geography 

The Tres de Febrero partido occupies only 0.01% of the surface of the Republic Argentina and accounts for 1.2% of the total population.

It is northeast of the Buenos Aires Province, is one of its 135 partidos. This integrated of urban conglomeration of Greater Buenos Aires.

Its roughly rectangular shape, is oriented in the direction from northwest to southeast, is west of the Buenos Aires city, which separates the General Paz Avenue. On the north, it borders the General San Martin Partido separates Triunvirato Avenue, General Lavalle and ways of Ferrocarril General Urquiza. The records defined separation northeast with the Reconquista River, natural boundary with the San Miguel Partido. Meanwhile, to the south borders the partides of Morón, Hurlingham and La Matanza are separated by a number of streets and avenues.

Limits 
The limits are:

 Street/Avenue (Bordering Partide)
 General Paz Avenue (Buenos Aires city).
 Díaz Vélez Avenue (La Matanza and Morón).
 República Avenue (La Matanza and Morón).
 Acayuasa street (Morón).
 Perdriel/República Avenue (Morón).
 General Justo José de Urquiza street (Morón).
 Ingeniero Guillermo Marconi street (Morón).
 Criss Cross the Colegio Militar
 Combate de Pavón street (Hurlingham).
 Reconquista River (San Miguel).
 General Lavalle street (General San Martín).
 Triunvirato street  (General San Martín).
 Ferrocarril General Urquiza (General San Martín).

Transport 
By Tres de Febrero three lines of railroads run through the partido: Urquiza Line, San Martín Line and Sarmiento Line.
And has 11 stations, 4 shared with San Martín and 1 shared with Morón:

• Urquiza Line:
 Coronel Lynch Station
 Fernández Moreno Station
 Lourdes Station
 Tropezón Station
 José María Bosch Station
 Martín Coronado Station
 Pablo Podestá Station
• San Martín Line:
 Sáenz Peña Station
 Santos Lugares Station
 Caseros Station
 El Palomar Station
• Sarmiento Line:
 Ciudadela Station

And some of the bus lines that run the partido are: 1, 53, 78, 85, 92, 96, 105, 123, 124, 135, 136, 146, 152, 163, 169, 181, 237, 242, 252, 310, 320, 326, 328 and 343.

Sport 

As for sports, Tres de Febrero has three sports centers municipalities where you can practice different types of disciplines, from swimming, athletics and football. The Centers are Ce.De.M. Number 1, Ce.De.M. Number 2 and the Ce.F. in which schools also use it to students to make physical education.

The partido also has three football club: Club Atlético Estudiantes, Club Almagro and Asociación Social y Deportiva Justo José de Urquiza better known as J. J. Urquiza.

The Club Atlético Estudiantes, is currently participating in the tournament Nacional B and the club not only practiced football, also there are a lot of disciplines. The club has a great friendship with Argentino de Rosario and Montevideo Wanderers Fútbol Club.
Its historical rival is Almagro who dispute the classic Tres de Febrero, one of the most important Greater Buenos Aires. Stadium Estudiantes have a maximum capacity nearly 17.000 people.
Almagro Club currently plays in the Primera B Metropolitana and their stadium has a capacity of 21.000 people. 
While J.J. Urquiza plays in
Primera C tournament, has its stages
capacity for 2.500 people.

Tres de Febrero also has different leagues and schools that work with dozens of participants, have added several cultural venues as the game is referred to as the provincial capital of sport with figures known as the boxer La Tigresa Acuña.

Know personalities 
 Ernesto Sabato
 Moria Casán
 Ricardo Iorio
 Laura "Panam" Franco
 Marcela "La Tigresa" Acuña
 Alejandro Dolina
 Carlos Tevez
 Andrés Ciro Martínez
 Estela Raval
 Gabriel "El Puma" Goity
 Gustavo Santaolalla

Twin towns 
Tres de Febrero is twinned with:

 , Folkestone.
 , Catanzaro.
 , El Dorado.
 , Lecco.
 , Gwangju.
 , Zaragoza.

References

External links

 
1959 establishments in Argentina
Partidos of Buenos Aires Province